Ctenophora ornata is a true crane fly species in the genus Ctenophora.

It is found in Europe.

References

Tipulidae
Insects described in 1818
Nematoceran flies of Europe
Taxa named by Johann Wilhelm Meigen